Virtual disk and virtual drive are software components that emulate an actual disk storage device.

Virtual disks and virtual drives are common components of virtual machines in hardware virtualization, but they are also widely used for various purposes unrelated to virtualization, such as for the creation of logical disks.

Operation
A virtual drive is a software component that emulates an actual disk drive, such as an optical disc drive, a floppy disk drive, or a hard disk drive. To other programs, a virtual drive looks and behaves like an actual physical device.

A virtual disk may be in any of the following forms:
 Disk image, a computer file that contains the exact data structure of an actual storage device
 Logical disk (also known as vdisk), an array of two or more actual drives that cooperatively act like a single device
 RAM disk, which stores its data in random-access memory (RAM) instead of on a storage device
 A mapped network drive that connects to a File Server

Uses
In hardware virtualization, virtual machines implement virtual drives as part of their efforts to emulate the behavior of an actual machine. As with an ordinary computer, a virtual machine needs one virtual drive and one disk image to start up, except when it is performing a network boot. More virtual drives are added as needed.

Virtual optical drives are used on physical computers to transfer the contents of the optical disks onto hard disk drives. Doing so helps in resolving the problem of the short life span of CDs and DVDs and takes advantage of the faster data transfer rate of hard disk drives. However, virtual optical drives are also used for software piracy: early computer games used disc existence verification to ensure licensed use, which can be circumvented using virtual optical drives. As a countermeasure, the StarForce copy protection scheme attempts to thwart disc virtualization. Modern video games have migrated to online product activation as part of their distribution process.

See also

 Comparison of disc image software
 Floating drive
 Removable media
 Storage virtualization

Hardware virtualization
Storage virtualization
Disk images